Peadar O'Loghlen may refer to
 Peter O'Loghlen (1883–1971) Irish politician
 Peadar O'Loughlin Irish musician